is an action-maze game developed by Konami and HexaDrive. The game was first released worldwide as a launch title for the Nintendo Switch in March 2017, and later for Microsoft Windows, PlayStation 4, and Xbox One in June 2018. Part of the Bomberman franchise, it is the sixth installment of the Super Bomberman series and the first game in the series to be released in twenty years (following 1997's Super Bomberman 5). It is also the first Bomberman entry in the franchise to be developed for consoles following the dissolution of original series owner Hudson Soft in 2012.

The game received mixed reviews, though many of the criticisms were addressed with post-release patches. , the game has sold over  copies worldwide.

A free-to-play, online-only spin-off titled  was released on Stadia on September 1, 2020, and on PlayStation 4, Xbox One, Nintendo Switch and Steam on May 27, 2021, and was shut down on December 1, 2022.

In June 2022, a sequel titled Super Bomberman R 2 was announced for Steam, Nintendo Switch, PlayStation 4, PlayStation 5, Xbox One, and Xbox Series X/S, and is set to release in 2023 as part of the Bomberman franchise's 40th Anniversary.

Gameplay
Players move through a two-dimensional grid environment and must trap and drop bombs to defeat their opponents. The game features story mode spanning 50 stages and supports cooperative gameplay for two players. The game also features an eight-player competitive multiplayer mode. The online mode contains a league system (Baby A/B, Novice A/B, Amateur A/B, Pro A/B, Champ A/B and God A/B). Starting in Baby league B the player has to win matches to gather and earn points for advancement.

Battle mode includes 19 battlegrounds in total. Besides the classic arena, it also offers a multi-level arena with springboards, ice-patterns, moveable blocks, etc., each with a unique style. In addition to the eight Bomberman Bros. and the Five Dastardly Bombers, Super Bomberman R also features a selection of new characters based on Konami Originals, such as Dracula Bomber, Vic Viper Bomber, Goemon Bomber and more. In total, there are 27 characters, each with special abilities.

Grand Prix was introduced with an update in November 2017. It contains 3 vs 3 battles in offline or online matches within 3 different arenas. Alongside new characters (with unique abilities) the player's goal is to collect as many gems as possible within the given time. Alternate mode is team fight which counts the total wins (blow-ups).

Plot
In a robot scrapyard, Emperor Buggler resurrects five robots to be his new henchmen, the Five Dastardly Bombers. Meanwhile, on Planet Bomber, White, the eldest and most disciplined of the eight heroic Bomberman Brothers of Planet Bomber, tries getting his younger siblings to train his siblings to no avail. Black is lazy and egocentric, Pink is more concerned about fashion and gossip, Blue sleeps all day, Red is hot-tempered, Yellow is overly naïve and innocent, Aqua hates violence, and Green is a manipulative sneak who deceives everyone. Just then, their television begins broadcasting a signal from Buggler, who proclaims his goal to conquer the universe and his army has already conquered five planets of the Starry Sky Nebula, swearing that all other planets will soon follow. He offers a challenge to anyone who would defy him to fight his generals. White immediately takes up the challenge and forces his siblings to come with him as he heads to the Starry Sky Nebula to face the Buggler army.

White and his siblings advance on the five worlds Buggler's henchmen have conquered, solving many issues linked to their conquest and defeating Buggler's army and his henchmen. However, when Buggler dares them to face him in outer space, the Bombermen discover that Buggler has created a black hole to destroy the universe while they were busy freeing the planets under his rule. Buggler summons his defeated henchmen to build a massive robot possessing all of their powers to overpower the Bombermen siblings, but they manage to defeat it. In response, Buggler merges with the robot, enlarging himself in the process. Just then, the Five Dastardly Bombers, now free from Buggler's control, give the siblings energy from Buggler's black hole and assist them in defeating Buggler and destroying the black hole. Despite receiving praise for saving the universe, however, White's siblings still refuse to train with White, to his anger.

Release
Super Bomberman R was developed by Konami and HexaDrive, and several people involved in the game are former Hudson Soft staff who had worked in past Bomberman titles. The game was announced on 12 January 2017 and released 3 March 2017 as a launch title for the Nintendo Switch console.
On 20 April 2017 free DLC was announced alongside regular updates with various gameplay improvements. The first DLC set includes four new stages and two new accessories. Future updates with various playable characters from other Konami franchises—including Vic Viper from Gradius, Simon Belmont from Castlevania, and Pyramid Head from Silent Hill 2—were also teased. Further updates with additions of new characters and entirely new gameplay modes are being released by Konami. Ports for PlayStation 4, Xbox One, and Microsoft Windows were released in June 2018, each featuring a platform-exclusive character: Ratchet from Ratchet & Clank for the PS4 version; Master Chief from the Halo series for the Xbox One version; and P-Body from Portal 2 for the Windows version. The original Switch version also received its own exclusive character via an update: the Bomberman franchise's own MAX. An update in June 2018 added WWE professional wrestler Xavier Woods as a playable character, along with additional Konami characters such as Solid Snake, Naked Snake and Raiden from the Metal Gear series.

Reception

Nintendo Life's preview stated that "Super Bomberman R isn't going to break any ground with its familiar explosions and mayhem, but it doesn't have to; sometimes, colourful old-school gaming is refreshing in this era of progressively darker and more complex titles." This was reiterated in their review, with Steve Bowling describing it as "no-frills", but "the go-to multiplayer launch title" for the Switch.

In Japan, the game's debut week sales reached 39,609 copies sold, marking the highest first-week sales for a Bomberman game since 1998's Bomberman World, which sold 76,801 copies in its first week. By August 2018, the game had sold over a million copies worldwide across all platforms. , the game has sold over  copies worldwide.

Super Bomberman R received "generally mixed reviews", according to review aggregator Metacritic.

References

External links
 

2017 video games
Bomberman
Konami games
Multiplayer and single-player video games
Nintendo Switch games
PlayStation 4 games
Windows games
Xbox One games
Video games developed in Japan
HexaDrive games
Crossover video games